Stuart Dunbar Croft (born 12 April 1954) is an English former professional footballer who played as a defender in the Football League for Hull City, Portsmouth and York City and in non-League football for Bridlington Trinity.

References

1954 births
Living people
Sportspeople from Ashington
Footballers from Northumberland
English footballers
Association football defenders
Hull City A.F.C. players
Portsmouth F.C. players
York City F.C. players
Bridlington Trinity F.C. players
English Football League players